Blues...? is an album by American jazz group the String Trio of New York recorded in 1993 for the Italian Black Saint label.

Reception
The Allmusic review by Scott Yanow awarded the album 4 stars stating "this is a successful effort, well worth seeking out by adventurous listeners".

Track listing
 "Cobalt Blue" (James Emery) - 8:44 
 "Depth" (John Lindberg) - 4:55 
 "Hurry up and Wait" (Regina Carter) - 5:13 
 "Speedball" (Lee Morgan) - 4:06 
 "I'm Afraid" (Duke Ellington) - 6:07 
 "A Suite of Works by Charlie Parker" (Charlie Parker) - 6:08 
 "Bellyachin' Blues" (Lindberg) - 7:16 
 "Red Shift" (Emery) - 6:02 
 "Freddie Freeloader" (Miles Davis) - 5:22 
Recorded at Barigozzi Studio in Milano, Italy on October 5 and 6, 1993

Personnel
Regina Carter - violin
James Emery - guitar
John Lindberg - bass

References

Black Saint/Soul Note albums
String Trio of New York albums
1993 albums